Veresvatnet or Veressjøen is a lake in the municipality of Verdal in Trøndelag county, Norway. The lake lies in the eastern part of the municipality, just west of the border with Sweden and just south of Blåfjella–Skjækerfjella National Park. The village of Vera and the Vera Chapel lie on the northern shores of the lake.

See also
List of lakes in Norway

References

Verdal
Lakes of Trøndelag